The 1998 season was Club de Regatas Vasco da Gama's 100th year in existence, the club's 83rd season in existence of football, and the club's 28th season playing in the Brasileirão Série A, the top flight of Brazilian football.

Players

Pre-season and friendlies

Competitions 
Times from 1 January to 14 February 1998 and from 11 October to 31 December 1998 are UTC–2, from 15 February 1998 to 10 October 1998 UTC–3.

Brasileirão Série A

League stage

League table

Results summary

Result round by round

Matches

Copa do Brasil

Copa Libertadores 

Vasco da Gama joined the competition in the group stage.

Group stage 
Group E

Knockout phase

Campeonato do Estado do Rio de Janeiro

Taça Guanabara

League table

Matches

Taça Rio de Janeiro

League table

Matches

Championship phase

European – South American Cup

South American – North American Cup

Copa Mercosur

Group stage 
Group E

Torneio Rio de Janeiro – São Paulo

Group stage 
Group A

Statistics

Squad appearances and goals 
Last updated on 5 December 1998.

|-
! colspan=18 style=background:#dcdcdc; text-align:center|Goalkeepers

|-
! colspan=18 style=background:#dcdcdc; text-align:center|Defenders

|-
! colspan=18 style=background:#dcdcdc; text-align:center|Midfielders

|-
! colspan=18 style=background:#dcdcdc; text-align:center|Forwards

|}

Notes

References

External links 

CR Vasco da Gama
Club de Regatas Vasco da Gama seasons
Vasco da Gama